Erich Ollenhauer (27 March 1901 – 14 December 1963) was the leader of the Social Democratic Party of Germany (SPD) from 1952 until 1963. He was a key leader of the opposition to Konrad Adenauer in the Bundestag. In exile under the Nazis, he returned to Germany in February 1946, becoming vice chairman of the SPD. He was a close ally of the chairman Kurt Schumacher, and worked on party organization.  Where Schumacher was a passionate intellectual, Ollenhauer was a thorough and efficient bureaucrat. He became party leader after Schumacher's death in 1952. Besides attending to organizational details, his main role was moderating the tension between the left-wing and right-wing factions. He remained party leader until his death, but yielded to the charismatic Berlin mayor Willy Brandt in 1961 as the party's candidate for chancellor.

Early political career and exile 
Ollenhauer was born in Magdeburg and joined the SPD in 1920. When the Nazis took power in 1933 he fled Germany for Prague. After the outbreak of WW2 Ollenhauer travelled across Europe in order to avoid Nazi persecution, first going to Denmark, then France, Spain, Portugal, and eventually London, where he remained until the end of the war. In London, he kept close ties to the Labour Party, which financially supported the expatriate SPD (called SoPaDe), of which Ollenhauer was a member. He also worked with the Union of German Socialist Organisations in Great Britain.

In February 1946, Ollenhauer returned to Germany. In May the same year, he was voted deputy leader of the SPD, behind Kurt Schumacher. Ollenhauer entered the Bundestag after the 1949 German federal elections.

Leadership of the SPD 
After Schumacher's unexpected death in 1952, the SPD elected Ollenhauer as its leader. He ran as the SPD's candidate for Chancellor of Germany in the 1953 and 1957 German elections, both of which were lost to Konrad Adenauer's CDU.

In 1957, Ollenhauer called for a trans-European security alliance (in place of NATO and the Warsaw Pact), in which a reunified Germany would serve as an equal partner. The plan was then denounced as radical, but it helped pave the way for Willy Brandt's Ostpolitik and indirectly influencing some developments within the European Union, such as a European common security policy, and the eventual reunification of Germany. Ollenhauer's proposal is also known as the Ollenhauer Plan.

In 1961, Ollenhauer declined to run for Chancellor a third time and instead supported the candidacy of Berlin mayor Willy Brandt.

Ollenhauer died in Bonn on 14 December 1963 from pulmonary embolism.

References

External links 

Biography of Erich Ollenhauer 

Politicians from Magdeburg
People from the Province of Saxony
Presidents of the Socialist International
1901 births
1963 deaths
Members of the Bundestag for North Rhine-Westphalia
Members of the Bundestag 1961–1965
Members of the Bundestag 1957–1961
Members of the Bundestag 1953–1957
Members of the Bundestag 1949–1953
Members of the Executive of the Labour and Socialist International
Members of the Bundestag for the Social Democratic Party of Germany